National Highway 19 (NH 19) is a national highway in India. It was previously referred to as Delhi–Kolkata Road and is one of the busiest national highways in India. After renumbering of national highways, Delhi to Agra route is now national highway 44 and Agra to Kolkata route is numbered national highway 19. It constitutes a major portion of the historical Grand Trunk Road. It is also part of AH1 of Asian Highway Network, that traverses from Japan to Turkey.

It was earlier known as NH 2 (Old) before renumbering of all national highways by Ministry of Road Transport and Highways in 2010.

Length

The lengths of the highway in each state are:
 Uttar Pradesh: 
 Bihar: 
 Jharkhand: 
 West Bengal:

National Highways Development Project

 Almost all of the  stretch of NH 19 has been selected as a part of the Golden Quadrilateral by the National Highways Development Project.
 Approximately  stretch of NH 19 between Barah and Kanpur has been selected as a part of the East-West Corridor by the National Highways Development Project.

Route

National Highway 19 connects Agra to Kolkata and transits four states of India, namely Uttar Pradesh, Bihar, Jharkhand and west Bengal.

NH 19 starts at Agra from its junction with NH-44 connecting Kanpur, Allahabad, Varanasi in the State of Uttar Pradesh, Sasaram, Aurangabad, Gobindpur in the State of Jharkhand, Asansol, and terminating at its junction with NH-16 near Kolkata in the State of West Bengal.

Toll plazas
From Agra to Kolkata the toll plazas are as follows: 
Uttar Pradesh
Tundla, Gurau Semra Atikabad, Anantram, Barajod, Badauri, Katoghan, Prayagraj Bypass (Khokhraj), Lalanagar, Daffi,Varanasi
Bihar
Mohania, Sasaram, Saukala
Jharkhand
Rasoiya Dhamna, Ghangri, Beliyad
West Bengal
Durgapur, Palsit and Dankuni.

Major cities on/off NH 19 

Uttar Pradesh

 Agra
 Firozabad
 Etawah
 Babarpur Ajitmal
 Auraiya
 Akbarpur
 Kanpur
 Fatehpur
 Prayagraj
 Bhadohi
 Mirzapur
 Varanasi
 Mughalsarai

Bihar
 Mohania
 Kudra
 Sasaram
 Dehri on sone
 Aurangabad
 Sherghati

Jharkhand
 Barhi
 Barkatha
 Bagodar
 Isri
 Gobindpur
 Dhanbad

West Bengal
 Asansol
 Durgapur
 Burdwan
 Dankuni

Junctions  

Uttar Pradesh
  Terminal near Agra.
 Interchange with Agra Lucknow Expressway near village Kathphori
  near Etawah
  near Etawah
  near Sikandara
  near Akbarpur, Kanpur Dehat
  near Kanpur
  near Fatehpur
  near Muratganj
  near Allahabad
  near Soraon
  near Prayagraj
  near Aura
  near Varanasi
  near Chandauli
  near Saiyad Raja
Bihar
  near Mohania
  near Mohania
  near Dehri
  near Aurangabad
  near Dobhi
Jharkhand
  near Barhi
  near Bagodar
  near Dumri
  near Gobindpur
  near Gobindpur

West Bengal
  near Kulti
  near Raniganj
  near Bardhaman
  near Bardhaman
  Terminal near Kolkata.

See also
 List of National Highways in India
 List of National Highways in India by state
 Howrah-Gaya-Delhi line railway track connecting Delhi and Kolkata
 National Highway 2 (India, old numbering)
 Grand Trunk Road
 Delhi to Kolkata Road condition (via NH19)

References

External links
 NH 19 on OpenStreetMap

AH1
National highways in India
National Highways in Uttar Pradesh
National Highways in Bihar
National Highways in Jharkhand
National Highways in West Bengal
Transport in Agra